HMY Charlotte was an English royal yacht, built in 1677 at Woolwich for the Royal Navy.

References 

1670s ships
Royal Yachts of the Kingdom of England